Pauzok is a flat-bottomed boat and is designed for travelling the rivers of Russia.

Aside from its flat bottom, another prominent feature of that is its lack of deck. The boat has a single mast, usually  in length, with a sail and is steered by oars.

There is a large space within the vessel, often used for storing cargo. Pauzoks are mainly built in the northern regions of Russia, such as the Volga and Lena River.

Pauzoks are also used to deliver cargo to the coast or in carrying cargo in sections where the river bed has a relatively steep slope, and can independently navigate rapids. If a pauzok beaches itself on a shore, the crew often uses a long, thick, and wide board which in Siberia is referred to as Opleukha ( Translated: slap in the face). The oarsmen use this as a lever to move the vessel towards a current. A small dam is formed, and small rising of water raises the pauzok and it can be pushed off from a bank on a deep-water place.

References 

Sailboat types